The 1955 Colgate Red Raiders baseball team is a baseball team that represented Colgate University in the 1955 NCAA baseball season. They were led by sixth-year head coach Red O'Hora. The Red Raiders qualified for the District 2 Tournament, where they would win a spot in the 1955 College World Series, where they finished fourth.

Roster

Schedule 

! style="" | Regular Season
|- valign="top" 

|- align="center" bgcolor="#ffcccc"
| 1 || April 2 || at  || Unknown • Charlottesville, Virginia || 5–15 || 0–1
|- align="center" bgcolor="#ccffcc"
| 2 || April 3 || at Virginia || Unknown • Charlottesville, Virginia || 8–4 || 1–1
|- align="center" bgcolor="#ccffcc"
| 3 || April  || at  || Emerson Field • Chapel Hill, North Carolina || 6–5 || 2–1
|- align="center" bgcolor="#ccffcc"
| 4 || April  || vs  || Unknown • Lexington, Virginia || 8–4 || 3–1
|- align="center" bgcolor="#ffcccc"
| 5 || April 9 || at  || Unknown • Gettysburg, Pennsylvania || 0–6 || 3–2
|- align="center" bgcolor="#ffcccc"
| 6 || April  ||  || Unknown • Hamilton, New York || 1–4 || 3–3
|- align="center" bgcolor="#ccffcc"
| 7 || April 16 || at  || Unknown • Princeton, New Jersey || 8–4 || 4–3
|- align="center" bgcolor="#ccffcc"
| 8 || April  || vs  || Unknown • Unknown || 6–5 || 5–3
|- align="center" bgcolor="#ccffcc"
| 9 || April  || vs  || Unknown • Unknown || 7–3 || 6–3
|- align="center" bgcolor="#ccffcc"
| 10 || April  || vs  || Unknown • Unknown || 5–4 || 7–3
|- align="center" bgcolor="#ccffcc"
| 11 || April  || vs  || Unknown • Unknown || 5–2 || 8–3
|- align="center" bgcolor="#ccffcc"
| 12 || April  || vs  || Unknown • Unknown || 11–0 || 9–3
|-

|- align="center" bgcolor="#ffcccc"
| 13 || May  || vs  || Unknown • Unknown || 6–10 || 9–4
|- align="center" bgcolor="#ccffcc"
| 14 || May  || vs  || Unknown • Unknown || 19–2 || 10–4
|- align="center" bgcolor="#cccccc"
| 15 || May  || vs  || Unknown • Unknown || 8–8 || 10–4–1
|- align="center" bgcolor="#ccffcc"
| 16 || May  || vs  || Unknown • Unknown || 9–4 || 11–4–1
|- align="center" bgcolor="#ccffcc"
| 17 || May 18 || at  || Unknown • Lewisburg, Pennsylvania || 8–0 || 12–4–1
|- align="center" bgcolor="#ffcccc"
| 18 || May 20 ||  || Unknown • Hamilton, New York || 5–6 || 12–5–1
|- align="center" bgcolor="#ccffcc"
| 19 || May 21 ||  || Unknown • Hamilton, New York || 9–4 || 13–5–1
|- align="center" bgcolor="#ccffcc"
| 20 || May  || vs  || Unknown • Unknown || 10–9 || 14–5–1
|- align="center" bgcolor="#ffcccc"
| 21 || May  || vs Syracuse || Unknown • Unknown || 2–3 || 14–6–1
|-

|-
! style="" | Postseason
|- valign="top"

|- align="center" bgcolor="#ccffcc"
| 22 || June 3 || vs Penn State || Breadon Field • Allentown, Pennsylvania || 7–4 || 15–6–1 
|- align="center" bgcolor="#ccffcc"
| 23 || June 4 || vs Ithaca || Breadon Field • Allentown, Pennsylvania || 7–6 || 16–6–1 
|-

|- align="center" bgcolor="#ffcccc"
| 24 || June 10 || vs Wake Forest || Johnny Rosenblatt Stadium • Omaha, Nebraska || 0–1 || 16–7–1
|- align="center" bgcolor="#ccffcc"
| 25 || June 12 || vs USC || Johnny Rosenblatt Stadium • Omaha, Nebraska || 0–1 || 17–7–1
|- align="center" bgcolor="#ffcccc"
| 26 || June 13 || vs Oklahoma A&M || Johnny Rosenblatt Stadium • Omaha, Nebraska || 2–4 || 17–8–1
|-

References 

Colgate Red Raiders baseball seasons
Colgate Raiders baseball
College World Series seasons